José Agüero Santelices was a Spanish footballer who played as a midfielder and forward for Athletic Club de Madrid and Racing de Santander in the late 1910s and early 1920s. The dates of his birth and death are unknown.

Biography
Born in Cantabria, he played with Athletic Madrid for just one season in 1916–17, featuring alongside the likes of Pagaza, Juan de Cárcer and Sócrates Quintana. At the end of the season, he returned to Cantabria, where he signed for Racing de Santander, with whom he played for 5 years until he retired in 1922. While he was a Athletic Madrid player, he was summoned to play for the Madrid national team in the 1917 Prince of Asturias Cup, an inter-regional competition organized by the RFEF. Initially, he wasn't meant to be called-up, but because the tournament coincided with the 1917 Copa del Rey Final between Madrid FC and Arenas, which prevented the national side from having the best players of Madrid FC, they had to call-in players from the Athletic and Racing de Madrid such as captain José María Castell, Sócrates Quintana, Miguel Mieg, Joaquín Pascual and Saturno Villaverde, forming a great attacking partnership with the latter, as together they scored 5 of Madrid's 7 goals in the tournament, with Agüero netting once in a 3–2 win over Cantabric and in decisive game against Catalonia in 2–0 win, thus contributing decisively in the capital side's triumph, winning the cup for the first time in the team's history despite being a weaker Madrid side than in the previous tournaments.

Honours

International
Madrid
Prince of Asturias Cup:
Champions (1): 1917

References

Year of birth missing
Year of death missing
Footballers from Cantabria
Spanish footballers
Association football forwards
Atlético Madrid footballers
Racing de Santander players